Adam Bashirovich Amirilayev, born 20 May 1963 in Burtunay, Dagestan Autonomous Soviet Socialist Republic, is a Russian politician.

In 2007, Amirilayev graduated from Dagestan State University with a specialty in jurisprudence.

In the 2007 State Duma elections, he was elected to the State Duma as a United Russia deputy. Amirilayev is Vice-Chairman of the Committee for Public Associations and Religious Organisations.

References

External links
  Adam Amirilayev profile at the State Duma website
  Profile at United Russia website

1963 births
Living people
People from Kazbekovsky District
Avar people
United Russia politicians
21st-century Russian politicians
Fifth convocation members of the State Duma (Russian Federation)
Sixth convocation members of the State Duma (Russian Federation)